Dolné Vestenice is a village and municipality in Prievidza District in the Trenčín Region of western Slovakia.

History
In historical records the village was first mentioned in 1349.

Geography
The municipality lies at an altitude of 228 metres and covers an area of 13.836 km2. It has a population of about 2,686 people.

Genealogical resources

The records for genealogical research are available at the state archive "Statny Archiv in Nitra, Slovakia"

 Roman Catholic church records (births/marriages/deaths): 1702-1935 (parish B)

See also
 List of municipalities and towns in Slovakia

References

External links

 
Surnames of living people in Dolne Vestenice

Villages and municipalities in Prievidza District